Fluorenylmethyloxycarbonyl chloride (Fmoc-Cl) is a chloroformate ester. It is used to introduce the fluorenylmethyloxycarbonyl protecting group as the Fmoc carbamate.

Preparation
This compound may be prepared by reacting 9-fluorenylmethanol with phosgene:

References

Chloroformates
Reagents for organic chemistry
Reagents for biochemistry
Biochemistry methods